Asparuh Vasilev  (born 14 November 1981 in Sofia) is a Bulgarian football midfielder who currently plays for Slivnishki geroi.

Vasilev previously played for Spartak Varna and Akademik Sofia in the A PFG.

References

External links
 Profile at Akademik Sofia 

1981 births
Living people
Bulgarian footballers
PFC Spartak Varna players
Akademik Sofia players
Atromitos Yeroskipou players
Association football midfielders
First Professional Football League (Bulgaria) players